Foresto Sparso is a comune (municipality) in the Province of Bergamo in the Italian region of Lombardy, located about  northeast of Milan and about  east of Bergamo.

Foresto Sparso borders the following municipalities: Adrara San Martino, Berzo San Fermo, Entratico, Villongo, Zandobbio.

Demographic evolution

References